St. Petersburgh Place is a street in the Bayswater area of London, located in the City of Westminster. It runs north to south from Moscow Road to Bayswater Road close to the northwestern entrance to Kensington Gardens. It was constructed by the property developer and painter Edward Orme during the Regency era. Like Moscow Road its name is a commemoration of the 1814 visit of Alexander I of Russia to London as part of the Allied celebrations following the victory in the Napoleonic Wars. Originally known simply as Petersburgh Place but later this was changed to St. Petersburgh Place, an alternative spelling of Saint Petersburg the capital of the Russian Empire. In 1818 Orme constructed a Bayswater Chapel for the growing number of inhabitants. From 1823 to 1826 Orme also developed the nearby Orme Square. Adjacent to the street is the smaller St. Petersburgh Mews which runs parallel northwards to Moscow Road.

It is noted for its two places of worship, the Anglican parish church St Matthew's, Bayswater and the Jewish New West End Synagogue, both of which are listed buildings. The street also features Lancaster Close, a 1920s art deco apartment block.

References

Bibliography
 Cockburn, J. S., King, H. P. F. & McDonnell, K. G. T.  & A History of the County of Middlesex. Institute of Historical Research, 1989.
 Mills, David Anthony. A Dictionary of London Place Names. Oxford University Press, 2010. 

Streets in the City of Westminster
Bayswater